This is a list of characters from the Highlander franchise.

Major characters

Major characters appear in more than one movie or series. Works are presented in chronological order.

Films

Highlander (1986)

Highlander II: The Quickening (1991)

Highlander III: The Sorcerer (1994)

Highlander: Endgame (2000)

Highlander: The Source (2007)

Series

Highlander: The Series (1992–1998)

The characters listed are those played by the regular and the recurring cast, as well as the guest cast credited in the opening credits. Characters played by guest cast listed in the closing credits are not listed. Characters are listed chronologically by order of appearance.

Main characters

Recurring characters

Immortals

Highlander: The Raven (1998–1999)

Main characters

Recurring characters

Guest cast

See also
List of Highlander cast members

External links

Highlander
Highlander
Highlander
Highlander
Highlander
Highlander